The Ladies Jersey Open was a women's professional golf tournament in Jersey, Channel Islands. It was included on the Ladies European Tour from 1983 to 1986.

Winners

Ladies European Tour event

Source:

References

External links
Ladies European Tour

Ladies Jersey Open
Golf in Jersey
Recurring sporting events established in 1983
Recurring sporting events disestablished in 1987